Metaxmeste is a genus of moths of the family Crambidae.

Species
Metaxmeste cinerealis (Della Beffa, 1942)
Metaxmeste elbursana (Amsel, 1961)
Metaxmeste nubicola Munroe, 1954
Metaxmeste phrygialis (Hübner, 1796)
Metaxmeste schrankiana (Hochenwarth, 1785)
Metaxmeste sericatalis (Herrich-Schäffer, 1848)
Metaxmeste staudingeri (Christoph, 1873)

References

Natural History Museum Lepidoptera genus database

Odontiini
Crambidae genera
Taxa named by Jacob Hübner